This article covers notable characters of the Tron franchise, including all of its various cinematic, literary, video game adaptations and sequels.

Development
For the first film, Richard Rickitt explains that to "produce the characters who inhabit the computer world, actors were dressed in costumes that were covered in black-and-white computer circuitry designs....With coloured light shining through the white areas of their costumes, the resulting characters appeared to glow as if lit from within....optical processes were used to create all of the film's computerized characters..."  Frederick S. Clarke reported that Tron: Legacy would "combine live action with Computer-generated imagery (CGI)," adding that "several characters...will be completely digital..."

Tron

Kevin Flynn
Kevin Flynn is a former employee of the fictional software company ENCOM and the protagonist of the first film. He is played by Jeff Bridges.

At the start of the first film, he owns "Flynn's", a video arcade where he impresses his patrons with his skills at games that (unknown to them) he designed at ENCOM, but remains determined to find evidence that ENCOM VP Ed Dillinger plagiarised Flynn's work to advance his position within the company. Throughout most of the film, Flynn travels around the digital world, accompanying the eponymous character Tron; but later discovers that as a User, he commands the physical laws of the digital world which empowers him beyond the abilities of an ordinary program. Eventually, he enables Tron to destroy the Master Control Program shown to oppress the digital world, and upon return to the material world obtains the evidence necessary to expose Dillinger, and becomes ENCOM's CEO himself.

Clu
Clu (short for Codified Likeness Utility) is a hacking program created by Flynn, with his likeness, to expose Dillinger's plagiarism.

In the film, he is seen operating a tank in the search to uncover the stolen data but is captured by the Master Control Program and absorbed into it. The information gained from Clu is subsequently used against Flynn as he tries to escape the game grid on a light cycle.

Alan Bradley
Alan Bradley is a computer programming working partner of Kevin Flynn at ENCOM. He is portrayed by Bruce Boxleitner.

At the start of the first film, he creates the Tron program that monitors communications between the MCP and the real world but finds its progress confined. As a result, he assists Flynn in exposing Dillinger. In the film, Tron addresses Alan with the username 'Alan-One'.

Tron

Tron is a security program created by Alan, with his likeness, to monitor communications between the MCP and the real world. He is the main digital protagonist of the first film.

In the film, he is captured by the MCP and forced to play on the Game Grid, but freed by Flynn and instructed by Alan to shut down the MCP. His code number is "JA-307020".

Lora Baines
Lora Baines is research engineer at ENCOM, the ex-girlfriend of Kevin Flynn and then-current girlfriend of Alan Bradley. She is played by Cindy Morgan.

She works as one of the assistants of Walter Gibbs in the designing of the laser that teleports Kevin Flynn into the digital world and creates the Yori program that assists in the derezzing procedure.

Yori
Yori is an input/output program created by Baines, with her likeness, to take charge of the creation of digital simulations (such as the Solar Sailer) and assist with the de-rezzing procedure of the digitizing laser.

The romantic interest of Tron and Flynn, Yori is reunited with Tron after he rescues her from the clutches of the MCP and helps Tron and Flynn reach its core, where their combined efforts destroy the MCP and its factional programs.

Walter Gibbs
Walter Gibbs is the founder of ENCOM, where he continues to work at as a scientist along with Lora Baines, working on the teleporting laser. After voicing concerns about the heavy restriction to the company mainframe computer in a meeting with Ed Dillinger, Dillinger responds by threatening him with being dismissed. He is portrayed by Barnard Hughes.

Dumont
Dumont is a "guardian" program created by Dr. Gibbs, with his likeness, to protect the ENCOM mainframe's I/O Tower. He even has a similar closeness with Yori that Gibbs had with her user, Lora Baines.

Ed Dillinger
Ed Dillinger is the Senior Executive Vice President of ENCOM and the main antagonist of the first film. He is played by David Warner.

Dillinger was a worker in ENCOM before plagiarizing Kevin Flynn's original work, after which he becomes the company's senior executive. He contributes to the rise of the Master Control Program that controls the ENCOM mainframe and creates the Sark program that acts as the MCP's second-in-command. Dillinger authorizes the MCP to tighten security controls upon learning of Flynn's seeking evidence of the theft of his work, but when he starts questioning the MCP's intent to defy his plans of capturing other programs, the MCP threatens to expose Dillinger's misdeeds. He is defeated and indeed disgraced when the MCP is destroyed, yet also relieved that the MCP is no more.

His son Ed Dillinger, Jr. appears at the beginning of Tron: Legacy in a minor role, portrayed by an uncredited Cillian Murphy.

Sark
Commander Sark is a command program created by Dillinger, with his likeness, to serve as chief lieutenant of the MCP and the secondary digital antagonist of the first film.

He oversaw the training of new programs kidnapped and brought to the Game Grid by the MCP and was known to enter the games himself from time to time. He is destroyed by Tron near the end of the film. In the novelization, his code number is "ES-1117821".

Master Control Program
The Master Control Program (MCP), voiced by David Warner and also played by Barnard Hughes, is the main digital antagonist of the first film.

It is an artificial intelligence created by ENCOM founder Walter Gibbs and improved by Ed Dillinger that ruled ENCOM's mainframe computer. During the rule of the MCP, many programs are enslaved and forced to play games against its henchmen. To gain information and power, the MCP threatens to expose Dillinger's theft of Flynn's creations. Dillinger uses the MCP to administer the company's computer network (in effect an AI Superuser); but it, empowered by Dillinger, begins to steal data from other systems, and comes to desire control of external corporations and even governments. The MCP is ultimately destroyed by Flynn and Tron.

Before its destruction, the MCP ends most of its conversations with Dillinger with the computer programming phrase "End of line". In the sequel, Tron: Legacy, the digital world contains a nightclub called the "End of Line Club".

Roy Kleinberg
Roy Kleinberg is one of ENCOM's first computer programmers and coworker of Alan Bradley. He is played by Dan Shor.

He makes only a brief cameo at the start of the first film, where he creates the Ram program that makes connections between ENCOM and an unnamed insurance company and begins working in a cubicle next to Alan's. When Alan went to Ed Dillinger about being blocked from the system, Kleinberg asks if he could have some of his popcorn which, Alan allows. Kleinberg is credited in the film as "Popcorn Co-Worker".

Kleinberg also appears in the short film "The Next Day," which was included on the Blu-ray edition of Tron Legacy, and it's also in the film where his name is officially mentioned. He is the leader of the "Flynn Lives" movement, along with Alan Bradley.

Ram
Ram is an actuarial program created by Kleinberg, with his likeness, to "work for a big insurance company" before being captured by the MCP and forced to play on the Game Grid.

While involved in the games, Ram exceeds his original programming to become a proficient gamer, and expresses a fair amount of confidence in his abilities while between contests; but took pride in his work as an actuarial program, which he seemed to associate with humanitarian purposes. He is injured by a game tank after escaping the game grid with Flynn and Tron, and he dies from these injuries in the company of Flynn.

Crom
Crom is a timid and pudgy compound interest program, created by full branch managing savings and loan bank programmer Mr. Henderson, who was captured by the MCP and forced to play on the Game Grid. He is played by Peter Jurasik.

Crom and Flynn are forced to battle each other in the ring game. Flynn gains the upper hand but refuses to kill a defenseless Crom, twice defying Sark's command to do so. Sark then derezzes the piece of the playing field that Crom is hanging from, which sends the hapless program falling to his death.

Bit
The Bit is a representation of a bit (binary digit), and as such is only capable of providing yes and no (1,0) answers to any question, through which it managed to convey various emotions. The Bit appeared twice in the movie, once at the beginning of the movie as companion to Clu and later as a companion to Flynn himself, and was originally to have a more extensive role; but has only two minutes for scheduling reasons. Despite this, the co-creators of Max Headroom, in their book Creative Computer Graphics, called it "one of the most memorable characters in the film." At the time of the film's release, the character represented an innovative use of vector graphics and morphing.

Physically, the Bit was represented within the movie by a blue polyhedral shape that alternated between the compound of dodecahedron and icosahedron and the small triambic icosahedron (the first stellation of the icosahedron). When the Bit says the answer "yes", it briefly changes into a yellow octahedron and when it says "no" it changes into a red 35th stellation of an icosahedron; these resemble prismatic forms or "3-D versions" of the Latin letters 'O' and 'X', respectively.

Tron 2.0, Tron: Killer App, Tron: The Ghost in the Machine
The video game Tron 2.0 was a direct sequel to Tron but is now non-canon with the release of Tron: Legacy and its various related titles. The comic book Tron: The Ghost in the Machine further explores the Tron 2.0 characters and storyline.

Jet Bradley
Jet Bradley is the son of Alan Bradley and Lora Baines Bradley and the protagonist of the game Tron 2.0. Jet is digitized while searching for his missing father. Within the digital world, he is tasked with locating the Tron Legacy Code.

Jet is also the basis for the experimental program that is the central character of Tron: The Ghost in the Machine. This version of Jet is a digital backup of the original User, copied and stored within the system. Due to the complexities involved in making a copy of a human being, the program version of Jet is corrupted and split into three separate aspects. Eventually, all aspects of the program are united and given the choice to ascend from the digital world into the real world.

Mercury
Mercury is a female humanoid computer program. She is voiced by Rebecca Romijn. She is known within the computer world as a champion lightcycle racer but also shows some combat skills during the course of the game. She returns in Tron: The Ghost in the Machine as one of the leaders of the resistance against the red version of the program Jet, who is masquerading as the MCP.

Ma3a
Ma3a (short for Math Assistant 3 Audio) is a female computer program. She is voiced by Cindy Morgan. Unlike most other programs in the computer world, Ma3a is shaped like a sphere. When she was originally improved from Yori by Lora Baines in March 1988, she was known as Ma1a (short for Math Assistant 1 Audio), followed by Ma2a (short for Math Assistant 2 Audio) in June 1996 and Ma3a in 2003. Ma3a carries many of Lora's personality traits and even sounds like her (Cindy Morgan also played Yori in TRON). Some ENCOM employees have come to believe that part of Lora was digitized into Ma3a's code in the midst of the 1994 digitizing accident that resulted in Lora's death. In March 2003, Alan Bradley was given the "Digital Pal" award for Ma3a.

Thorne
J.D. Thorne was an executive from fCon who was improperly digitized into the computer and became corrupted, spreading like a virus throughout the system. Corrupted programs that follow Thorne as "The Master User" are called Z-Lots (pronounced "zealots"). Thorne is derezzed after a battle with the Kernel. Before he dies, he passes along vital information on fCon to Jet Bradley.

The Kernel
The Kernel is a security program commanding the system's ICPs. He was destroyed by Jet Bradley during a battle with the corrupted user Thorne.

Byte
The Byte is similar to the Bit in visual design and also speaks in a modulated voice. Unlike the Bit, the Byte is able to speak in full English sentences.

Data Wraiths
Data Wraiths are digitizable, elite hacker users that were employed by fCon to create havoc in computer systems around the world, steal top-secret data, and destroying the databases of fCon's competitors. When they derez in the computer world they are kicked out of the computer and return to their original human form, unconscious.

Seth Crown, Eva Popoff, and Esmond Baza
Seth Crown, Eva Popoff, and Esmond Baza are three fCon executives who attempted to transfer themselves into the computer world unaware that the correction algorithms necessary for proper transfer had been disabled. Without the algorithms, the digitization process went awry and the three executives were merged into one horrible monstrosity. After being defeated and pushed out of the digitizing stream by Jet (both for his safety and theirs, as their corrupted state would have killed them in the real world), they are stored in a hard drive so Alan can fix their code.

Tron: Legacy, Tron: Betrayal, Tron: Uprising and Tron: Evolution
Tron: Legacy, its comic book tie-in Tron: Betrayal, the animated television prequel Tron: Uprising and the video game tie-in Tron: Evolution are all direct sequels to Tron. Several characters appear in all four pieces of the franchise while others are specific to one component. All four parts establish a specific time line of the Tron universe.

Sam Flynn
Samuel "Sam" Flynn is the son of Kevin Flynn who is a controlling shareholder at ENCOM and the protagonist of Tron: Legacy, played by Garrett Hedlund and voiced in the video games by Ross Thomas.

After 20 years of his father's absence, Sam is lured onto the Grid, where he reunites with his father and catalyzes the action of the second film, culminating in the destruction of Clu 2. Deciding to take responsibility of ENCOM, he names Alan the Chairman of the Board and takes Quorra to see her first sunrise.

Quorra
Quorra is a skilled warrior and the last remaining member of a group of "isomorphic algorithms" destroyed by Clu 2, played by Olivia Wilde and voiced in video games by Erin Cottrell.

In the second film, she is a confidante to Kevin Flynn, who saved her from Clu 2's purge of the ISOs. Anxious to experience the outside world, Quorra accompanies Sam to escape the grid and enter the real world; both her name and her story-arc appear to relate to the Greek myth of Persephone."

Clu 2

Clu 2 (short for Clu 2.0) is an updated version of Clu created by Kevin Flynn to oversee the development of the Grid and the main antagonist of Tron: Legacy. He is physically played by John Reardon, with Jeff Bridges lending his likeness and voice to the character.

Programmed with the command of creating a "perfect system", Clu 2 grew to resent Flynn – particularly, his fondness for the "imperfect", spontaneously-generated Isos, or "isomorphic algorithms". Clu 2 later betrayed Flynn and Tron to seize total control of the Grid, and then enacted genocide upon the Isos, and forced Flynn into hiding for twenty years.

Over this period, Clu 2 kept the Grid under his own control, reprogramming his opponents as soldiers for his own army, led by a reprogrammed Tron under the name 'Rinzler'. He continued to seek Flynn for his "identity disc", whose contents would allow Clu 2 to cross into the real world; and later lured Flynn's son Sam onto the Grid. After first trying to destroy him, Clu 2 uses Sam to draw out Flynn and obtains his identity disc. He is destroyed after a long series of struggles, at whose end Flynn 'reintegrates' Clu 2 into himself, apparently destroying them both.

ISOs
The ISOs (short for Isomorphic algorithms) are a race of programs that spontaneously arose on the Grid. Clu 2 saw them as an obstacle to his creation of a perfect system whilst Kevin Flynn saw them as the next stage of evolution; where Clu 2 betrayed Flynn and destroyed most of the ISOs. The last remaining ISO is Quorra, saved by Flynn and sent to the real world with Sam.

Castor/Zuse
Castor is a flamboyant supermodel program and the owner of the End of Line club located inside the tallest tower on the Grid, played by Michael Sheen.

When originally named "Zuse", he was an ally of Flynn's and the ISOs' under his former name, but he betrays Sam and Quorra to bargain with Clu 2; he wishes to control the Grid once Clu 2 leaves for the real world. However, though Clu 2 seems to agree to the bargain, he traps Castor in his club, setting off explosions that kill him and his associate Gem.

Zuse is most likely named after Konrad Zuse, whose Z3 was the first automatic programmable digital computer constructed, in 1941.

Tron/Rinzler
Rinzler is a security program that serves as Clu 2's right-hand man, played by Anis Cheurfa, a well-known martial-arts performer cast for his abilities, stunts, and acrobatic talents, with Bruce Boxleitner lending his voice and likeness for the character.

Considered a master warrior, he uses two identity discs in combat and displays advanced acrobatic talent. The two-disc DVD edition of the original Tron revealed that in the late 1970s, Lisberger Studios had produced an early demo animation showing the character 'Tron' similarly armed with two "exploding discs" (see Tron Origins). Later in Tron: Legacy, it is revealed that Rinzler is a re-purposed form of the version update of Tron known as Tron 2 (short for Tron 2.0). Although it appears in Legacy that Tron was defeated in the initial strike of Clu 2's coup, Tron: Uprising reveals that he initially escaped capture, at the cost of severe injury and served as a mentor to the program Beck in inciting insurrection against Clu 2's new regime; it has yet to be shown at what point in the time between Uprising and Legacy that Tron was captured and repurposed. As Rinzler, he has several encounters with Sam Flynn throughout Legacy, culminating in an aerial pursuit, during which he remembers his past identity and turns against Clu 2, who sends Rinzler plummeting into the Sea of Simulation. Rinzler's ultimate fate is left unknown, but as he sinks into the Sea, his red markings (indicating alliance to/control by Clu 2) fade to his original blue colors.

Rinzler is named after Lucasfilm Executive Editor, J.W. Rinzler, who has authored several books, including The Making of Star Wars, The Complete Making of Indiana Jones, and Making of The Empire Strikes Back. Director Joseph Kosinski chose the name during a working session with the writers when one of Rinzler's books happened to be on the table.

Jarvis
Jarvis is an administration program who serves as Clu 2's chief bureaucrat, played by James Frain.

While probably efficient in his function, his personality is shown to be sycophantic and cowardly. Jarvis attempts at every turn to impress Clu 2 and win approval. After Jarvis fails to prevent Sam Flynn from taking back his father's disc, Clu 2 derezzes him.

Bartik
Bartik is a basic program, leader of a rebel faction in TRON City, played by Conrad Coates.

In TRON: Uprising, he and his friend: Hopper joined a task force form by Paige to hunt down the renegade, after witnessing the workers standing up to Pavel, he and Hopper joined in also to defend the Renegade. In TRON Legacy, he is first seen speaking to Castor demanding an audience to Zuse, when the Black Guards attack the club, he started fighting them but was quickly derezzed.

Edward Dillinger Jr.
Edward Dillinger Jr. is the son of Ed Dillinger and lead programmer on the ENCOM operating system, played by an uncredited Cillian Murphy.

Edward Dillinger Jr. is seen attending an ENCOM board meeting at the beginning of Legacy. He has earned a reputation for making the ENCOM operating system more secure and harder to copy than previous versions.

When Sam Flynn releases the software for free, Dillinger suggests that the company take credit and claim that it was a gift to their customers to defuse the situation.

Anon
Anon is the main protagonist of Tron: Evolution. He is a security program owned by Kevin Flynn to try to maintain order in the grid and to investigate conspiracies. He teamed with Quorra in trying to stop Clu 2 from taking over the grid but was derezzed saving her from falling debris.

Abraxas
Abraxas is the main antagonist of Tron: Evolution. He is voiced by John Glover. He was formerly an ISO named Jalen before he was re-purposed by Clu 2 as a computer virus to justify the purge of the other ISOs from the Grid.

Beck
Beck is a young vehicle maintenance program and the main protagonist of Tron: Uprising. He is voiced by Elijah Wood.

Through most of the series, Beck leads a revolution against Clu 2 and his armies from within the digital realm of the Grid. He is trained by Tron and looks up to him as a mentor throughout his time as a games warrior. Beck eventually becomes as powerful as Tron and challenges the tyranny of Tesler and his oppressive forces.

Tesler
General Tesler is a command program that serves as one of Clu 2's generals and the main antagonist of Tron: Uprising. He is voiced by Lance Henriksen.

He is in charge of the forces occupying Argon City; Paige and Pavel report directly to him. He believes Tron is dead until Beck (taking on the mantle of Tron.) arrives, he calls him the "Renegade". Whenever Beck arrives to help the people of Argon, Tesler tries to stop him by any means. In a flashback, he recruited Paige into joining him when he claimed the ISOs derezzed her friends, in reality, he order her friends executed. Tesler has no problem derezzing his own men for either failing or reporting that the Renegade is Tron. Tesler has the ability to stressed-out his arms and derezzed anyone or anything with his hands, he's shown to dislike Dyson and fearing failure to Clu should the Renegade free Argon and the Grid.

Dyson
Dyson is Clu's highest-ranking officer, sent to spearhead the apprehension of the Renegade and one of the recurring antagonist of Tron: Uprising. He is voiced by John Glover.

Dyson started out as a friend and member of Tron's security force. While trying to stop a riot between some programs and ISOs, Dyson got half his face derezzed. Believing Flynn has betrayed the grid due to siding with ISOs, he later joined Clu (who repaired his face) and participated in the coup against Tron and Flynn. He scarred Tron's face irreparably using Tron's own code. Tron was believed dead by Dyson since the recognizer carrying him was shot down. Dyson was sent to Argon to deal with the Renegade. Tron sent Beck to capture him, but Dyson proved to be too clever. When Tron arrived to face him, Dyson believed he was the Renegade until Tron revealed himself to him. Dyson offered Tron to join him, but Tron refused. Tron almost derezzed Dyson, but he decided to spare him so he can deliver a message to Clu. This causes Dyson to flee Argon and report Tron's survival to Clu. When asked who else knows, he derezzes Clu's sentry and said: "Nobody, only us."  Clu then advises to keep it that way.

Minor characters
 Gem is a character in Tron: Legacy, played by Beau Garrett. She is a servant to Castor while ostensibly working for Clu 2. She is presumably destroyed by Clu 2 alongside Castor.
 Able is a character in Tron: Uprising and is voiced by Reginald VelJohnson. Able runs Able's Garage, where Zed, Mara, and Beck all work and knows Tron. He is killed by Cyrus in "No Bounds" while freeing Zed and Mara.
 Link is a character in Tron: Uprising, voiced by David Arquette. Link is a worker at Able's Garage and is also friends with Beck, Zed, and Mara.
 Mara is a character in Tron: Uprising, voiced by Mandy Moore. A friend of Beck's at Able's Garage, Mara is attracted to The Renegade.
 Paige is a character in Tron: Uprising and is voiced by Emmanuelle Chriqui. She is one of Tesler's field commanders. While hardened and dedicated, she is less antagonistic than Tesler and takes a personal interest in the new Tron.
 Pavel is a character in Tron: Uprising, voiced by Paul Reubens. Sadistic and power-hungry, Pavel seeks to undermine Paige and General Tesler.
 Zed is a character in Tron: Uprising, voiced by Nate Corddry. Zed is one of Beck's friends at Able's Garage and has a romantic interest in Mara.

References

Animated characters
Disney characters originating in film
Lists of Disney characters
Science fiction film characters
Characters
Fictional operating systems